"Leave You Alone" is a song by American rapper Young Jeezy featuring American singer-songwriter Ne-Yo. Produced by Warren G, the song was released on February 21, 2012 as the fifth single from Jeezy's fourth studio album Thug Motivation 103: Hustlerz Ambition (2011).

Remix
Rapper/producer Warren G remixed the song for his mixtape, "No One Could Do It Better".

Chart performance
Leave You Alone first charted on the US Billboard Hot R&B/Hip-Hop Songs at number 66 on the week of February 27, 2012. The single eventually reached it peak at number three on the chart.
On the week of March 31, 2012, the song debuted at number 95 on the US Billboard Hot 100 chart. The song eventually reached it peak at number 51. On October 6, 2020, the single was certified platinum by the Recording Industry Association of America (RIAA) for combined sales and streaming equivalent units of over a million units in the United States.

Charts

Weekly charts

Year-end charts

Certifications

References

2011 songs
2012 singles
Ne-Yo songs
Songs written by Ne-Yo
Songs written by Jeezy
Jeezy songs
Def Jam Recordings singles
G-funk songs
Songs written by Warren G
Pop-rap songs